Reinald (died 18 January 1135) was a Norwegian Catholic bishop of Stavanger. He was the first bishop of the Diocese of Stavanger.

It has been discussed if he came from Winchester in England.

He is known for the construction work of the Stavanger Cathedral. Even if the construction periode of the cathedral was about 1100 to 1150.

Being in conflict with the king, Harald Gille, he was hanged in Bergen on 18 January 1135. Other than that, he was also fined very shortly before for not disclosing information on gold treasures hidden by Magnus the Blind.

References

1135 deaths
Clergy from Winchester
Executed people from Hampshire
People executed by Norway by hanging
12th-century executions by Norway
Executed Roman Catholic priests
12th-century Roman Catholic bishops in Norway
12th-century English clergy
Year of birth unknown